Pinch Creek is a stream in Montgomery County in the U.S. state of Missouri. It is a tributary of the Loutre River.

Pinch Creek (historically called "Pinch Branch") was named on account of the settlers in the area being "in a pinch".

See also
List of rivers of Missouri

References

Rivers of Montgomery County, Missouri
Rivers of Missouri